The stipplethroats are a South and Central American genus of passerine birds in the antbird family Thamnophilidae. They were previously included in the genus Myrmotherula as the "stipple-throated group".

Characteristics
Molecular studies show that the genus Myrmotherula as then defined was polyphyletic. The stipple-throated members form a clade that is not a sister clade to any of the remaining members, and the genus Epinecrophylla has been erected to accommodate them. The stipple-throated species have a black and white (or buffy-white) stippled throat in one or both of the sexes. They also have a relatively long, plain-coloured tail. That this clade is distinct from the remaining members of the Myrmotherula is reinforced by differences in song, foraging behaviour and nest-building.

Ecology
Members of the genus Epinecrophylla tend to specialise in extracting insects and spiders from dangling clusters of dead leaves, foraging in this way for more than 75% of the time. While foraging they have stereotyped methods of manipulating the leaves with their beaks and feet; by way of contrast, members of Myrmotherula tend to hunt for prey on the surfaces of leaves, stems, twigs, mosses and vines, and none of those birds specialises in and manipulates dead leaves, although they do sometimes probe them with their beaks. Another characteristic of Epinecrophylla seems to be the dome-shaped nest with side or oblique entrance; three of the species have this characteristic, while the nesting behaviours of the other members of the genus are not known.

Species
The genus contains eight species:
 Checker-throated stipplethroat (Epinecrophylla fulviventris)
 Brown-bellied stipplethroat (Epinecrophylla gutturalis)
 White-eyed stipplethroat (Epinecrophylla leucophthalma)
 Rufous-backed stipplethroat (Epinecrophylla haematonota)
 Rio Madeira stipplethroat (Epinecrophylla amazonica)
 Foothill stipplethroat (Epinecrophylla spodionota)
 Ornate stipplethroat (Epinecrophylla ornata)
 Rufous-tailed stipplethroat (Epinecrophylla erythrura)

References